"Burn Out" is a song by Dutch DJs Martin Garrix and Justin Mylo. It features American Singer Dewain Whitmore and was released on 14 September 2018, via Garrix's Netherland-based record label Stmpd Rcrds, and exclusively licensed to Epic Amsterdam, a division of Sony Music.

Background
"Burn Out" is the second released collaboration of Garrix and Mylo, the first being "Bouncybob". It was first premiered at Ultra Music Festival in Miami in March 2017. Billboard described the song as a "fun and flirty end-of-summer jam with an uplifting dance-pop hook and a funky synth line." It suggested that the song may be "big enough" for a music festival performance and "cute enough" as music for listening with friends during a prolonged drive. The single's release follows the launch of a new platform that is a partnership between Garrix and Axe. Garrix said "I am very honored to be part of the AXE Music platform roll out. I love the campaigns AXE has done in the past and when we all met in my studio, I felt a great connection, which is super important for me in collaborations like this. I am super happy with the result of the video for my new single "Burn Out"."

Music video
In the music video, the male protagonist is seen crushing in a laundry room on a girl who is his love interest, before going into different portals that have separate themes resembling the "wild realities in his mind" and eventually gaining confidence to talk to her. Martin Garrix makes a brief appearance in the video.

Charts

Weekly charts

Year-end charts

Certifications

References

2018 songs
Martin Garrix songs
Justin Mylo songs
Electro house songs
Stmpd Rcrds singles
Songs written by Ilsey Juber
Songs written by Martin Garrix
Songs written by Dewain Whitmore Jr.